The 1872 Massachusetts gubernatorial election was held on November 5, 1872. Republican Governor William B. Washburn was re-elected to a second term in office over businessman Francis W. Bird, a Liberal Republican nominated with support of the Democratic Party.

Republican nomination

Candidates
Benjamin Butler, U.S. Representative from Lowell and candidate for Governor in 1871
William B. Washburn, incumbent Governor

Convention
With an incumbent seeking re-election, the Republican convention was far less contentious than the open race of 1871. Nevertheless, supporters of Benjamin F. Butler placed his name in opposition to Washburn and a vote was taken.

Washburn's renomination was then made unanimous. A subsequent inquiry found that Butler's totals were inflated by "ballot-stuffing and other improper devices." In the only other contested race, Thomas Talbot defeated Elijah B. Stoddard by 643 to 395 for Lieutenant Governor.

General election

Results

See also
 1872 Massachusetts legislature

References

Governor
1872
Massachusetts
November 1872 events